The following are the association football events of the year 1996 throughout the world.

Events
Copa Libertadores 1996: Won by River Plate after defeating América de Cali 2–1 on aggregate.
UEFA Euro 1996: Germany defeats the Czech Republic 2–1 with a golden goal from Oliver Bierhoff at Wembley Stadium.
The UEFA Regions' Cup is founded for amateur teams in Europe to have an international tournament.
 February 7 – Logi Ólafsson makes his debut as the manager of Iceland with a 1–7 loss against Slovenia.
March 3 – Dutch club NEC fires Wim Koevermans and appoints former coach Leen Looyen as his successor.
April 6 – Major League Soccer kicks-off: an overflow crowd of 31,683 packed Spartan Stadium to witness the historic first match. San Jose Clash forward Eric Wynalda scored the league's first goal in a 1–0 victory over D.C. United.
May 11 – Manchester United wins 1–0 over Liverpool to claim the FA Cup. United becomes the first team to win the English League and Cup Double twice.
May 16 – PSV claims the KNVB Cup after defeating Sparta Rotterdam at De Kuip, 5–2.
August 18 – PSV wins the Johan Cruyff Shield, the annual opening of the new season in the Eredivisie, following a 3–0 win over Ajax.
August 27 – Manager Alan Ball is fired by Manchester City and succeeded by Steve Coppell.
October 9 – Manager Huub Stevens leaves Roda JC. He is replaced by interim-coach Eddy Achterberg, and later by Martin Jol.
November 8 – Phil Neal replaces Manchester City manager Steve Coppell as caretaker, to be succeeded by Frank Clark on December 29.
November 26 – Juventus wins the Intercontinental Cup in Tokyo after defeating Argentina's River Plate 1–0. The match's only goal is scored by Alessandro del Piero in the 81st minute.

Undated:
 Heidelberg Ball School is founded in Germany.

Winner club national championships

Asia
 Japan – Kashima Antlers
 Lebanon – Al-Ansar
 Qatar – Al-Arabi
 South Korea – Ulsan Hyundai Horang-i
 Iran – Persepolis

Europe
  – Dinamo Zagreb
  – Slavia Prague
  – Manchester United
  – Auxerre
  – Borussia Dortmund
  –A.C. Milan
 
 Eredivisie – Ajax
 Eerste Divisie – AZ
  – Widzew Łódź
  – Porto
  – Atlético Madrid
  – Fenerbahçe
  – Partizan

North America

1995–96 – Necaxa
Inverno 1996 – Santos

Seattle Sounders (APSL)
D.C. United (MLS)

South America

Clausura – Vélez Sársfield
Apertura – River Plate
 – Bolívar
 – Grêmio
 – Colo-Colo
 – El Nacional
 Paraguay – Cerro Porteño
 – Sporting Cristal

International tournaments
 African Cup of Nations in South Africa (January 13 – February 3, 1996)
 
 
 
 UEFA European Football Championship in England (June 8 – 30 1996)
 
 
 —
 Baltic Cup in Narva, Estonia (July 7 – 9 1996)
 
 
 
Olympic Games in Atlanta, United States (July 20 – August 3, 1996)
Men's Tournament
 
 
 
Women's Tournament
  United States
  PR China
  Norway

National team results

Europe



Births

January
 1 January:
 Mahmoud Dahoud, German footballer
 Andreas Pereira, Brazilian footballer
 Mathias Jensen, Danish footballer
 7 January: Isaac Success, Nigerian footballer
 11 January: Leroy Sané, German footballer
 21 January
 Marco Asensio, Spanish footballer
 Aldo Kalulu, French youth international
 Cristian Pavón, Argentine international
 23 January: Ruben Loftus-Cheek, English footballer
 24 January: Patrik Schick,  Czech footballer
 26 January: Zakaria Bakkali, Belgian footballer

February
 2 February: Harry Winks, English footballer
 11 February:  
 Jonathan Tah, German footballer
 Lucas Torreira, Uruguayan footballer
 14 February:  
 Lucas Hernandez, French footballer
 Viktor Kovalenko, Ukrainian footballer
 28 February: Danilo Barbosa, Brazilian footballer

March
 4 March:
 Timo Baumgartl, German footballer
 Antonio Sanabria, Paraguayan footballer
 6 March: Timo Werner, German footballer
 15 March: Levin Öztunalı, German footballer
 24 March: Valentino Lazaro, Austrian footballer
 28 March: Benjamin Pavard, French footballer

April
 9 April: Giovani Lo Celso, Argentinian footballer
 10 April: Andreas Christensen, Danish footballer
 11 April: Dele Alli, English footballer
 29 April: Gustav Engvall, Swedish footballer

May
 2 May: Julian Brandt, German footballer
 3 May: Alex Iwobi, Nigerian footballer
 5 May: Matheus Pereira, Brazilian footballer
 11 May: Andrés Cubas, Argentine-born Paraguayan footballer
 17 May: Youcef Atal, Algerian footballer
 26 May: Lukáš Haraslín, Slovak footballer
 30 May: Aleksandr Golovin, Russian footballer

June
 11 June: Hakeeb Adelakun, English footballer
 12 June: Davinson Sánchez, Colombian footballer
 13 June: Kingsley Coman, French footballer
 17 June: Godfred Donsah, Ghanese footballer
 18 June: Alen Halilović, Croatian footballer
 22 June:
 Yusupha Bobb, Gambian footballer
 Mikel Merino, Spanish footballer
 28 June: Milot Rashica, Kosovar footballer 
 29 June: Bart Ramselaar, Dutch international footballer

July
 3 July: Kumaahran Sathasivam, Malaysian footballer
 5 July: Ajdin Hrustic, Australian footballer
 7 July: Ivan Ljubic, Austrian footballer
 11 July: Andrija Živković, Serbian footballer
 12 July: Moussa Dembélé, French footballer
 18 July:
 Dzhamaldin Khodzhaniyazov, Russian footballer
 Siebe Schrijvers, Belgian footballer
 22 July: Indy Groothuizen, Dutch footballer

August
 7 August: Dani Ceballos, Spanish footballer
 12 August: Arthur, Brazilian footballer
 14 August: Neal Maupay, French footballer
 19 August: Almoez Ali, Sudanese-Qatari footballer
 21 August: Sofyan Amrabat, Dutch-born Moroccan footballer
 27 August: Ebru Topçu, Turkish footballer
 30 August: Gabriel Barbosa, Brazilian footballer

September
 5 September: Richairo Zivkovic, Dutch footballer
 16 September: Alexis Blin, French footballer
 17 September: Duje Ćaleta-Car, Croatian footballer
 20 September: Jerome Sinclair, English footballer
 25 September: Max Christiansen, German footballer
 27 September: Maxwel Cornet, French-Ivorian footballer

October
 3 October: Kelechi Iheanacho, Nigerian footballer
 12 October: Riechedly Bazoer, Dutch footballer
 13 October: Terens Puhiri, Indonesian footballer
 15 October: Charly Musonda, Belgian footballer
 27 October: Nadiem Amiri, German footballer

November
 23 November: James Maddison, English footballer
 29 November: Gonçalo Guedes, Portuguese footballer

December
 4 December: Diogo Jota, Portuguese footballer
 8 December: Scott McTominay, Scottish footballer 
 15 December: Oleksandr Zinchenko, Ukrainian footballer
 16 December: 
 Wilfred Ndidi, Nigerian footballer
 Sergio Reguilón, Spanish footballer

Deaths

January
January 2 – Karl Rappan (90), Austrian footballer and manager

February
February 23 – Helmut Schön (80), German footballer and manager

May
 May 11 – Ademir Marques de Menezes, Brazilian striker, top scorer at the 1950 FIFA World Cup. (73)
 May 16 – Danilo Alvim, Brazilian midfielder, runner up at the 1950 FIFA World Cup. (75)

August
 August 2 – Obdulio Varela, Uruguayan midfielder, winner as captain of the 1950 FIFA World Cup, commonly regarded as one of the greatest classic holding midfielders. (78)

September
September 17 – Teodoro "Lolo" Fernandez (84), Peruvian footballer

October
 October 4 – Silvio Piola, Italian striker, winner of the 1938 FIFA World Cup, scoring two goals in the final. Highest goalscorer in Italian first league history. (83)
 October 30 – Roberto Belangero, Brazilian midfielder, runner-up at the 1957 South American Championship. (68)

November
November 7 – Hans Klodt (82), German international footballer
November 26 – Guido Gratton (64), Italian footballer

References

 
Association football by year